Association Sportive Salé, commonly known as AS Salé, is a Moroccan basketball club from Salé. The club competes in the Division Excellence and the Basketball Africa League (BAL). Notable players of the team include senior men's Moroccan national basketball team members Abderrahim Najah, Zakaria El Masbahi and Soufiane Kourdou.

Salé has won the Moroccan championship 9 times and the Moroccan cup 11 times. The team won one continental title, the FIBA Africa Champions Cup which it won in 2017. Salé also participated in the first two seasons of the Basketball Africa League (BAL).

History
The basketball section of multi-sports club AS Salé was established on 1928. The team played in the Division Excellence, Morocco's first tier, for years but did not win its first league title until 2010.

On 20 December 2017, Salé won the 2017 FIBA Africa Champions Cup, Salé's first international title and the first title of a Moroccan team at the event in almost 20 years. It did so by defeating Étoile de Radès in Radès, winning the final 77–69. Head coach of the winning team was Said El Bouzidi. After the tournament, Salé's Abdelhakim Zouita was named Most Valuable Player of the competition while Abderrahim Najah was honoured with a place in the All-Star Five.

In the following continental season, Salé had another outstanding year. The team reached the final for its second consecutive year but failed to defeat Angolan side Primeiro de Agosto.

As winners of the 2018–19 Moroccan League, Salé qualified for the inaugural season of the Basketball Africa League (BAL). In its debut season, Salé reached the quarterfinals behind league top scorer Terrell Stoglin who averaged 30.8 points per game. After two seasons were suspended due to the COVID-19 pandemic, the team won its eight national title on 27 July 2021, after edging FUS Rabat in the final.

In March 2022, Liz Mills signed as head coach of Salé, becoming the first female head coach of a men's team in Morocco and the Arab world. In the 2022 BAL season, they were eliminated by Petro de Luanda for a second year in a row. Mills left Salé after the BAL, making space for Said El Bouzidi to return. On 30 June 2022, Salé won its ninth Division Excellence championship after beating FUS Rabat in the finals.

Honours

Players

Current roster
The following is AS Salé's roster for the 2022 BAL season.

Past rosters
2021 BAL season

Notable players

 Soufiane Kourdou (2005–present)
 Abdelali Lahrichi
 Zakaria El Masbahi
 Abderrahim Najah (2009–present)
 Abdelhakim Zouita (2008–2012; 2013–present)
 Yassine El Mahsini (2016–present)
 Khalid Boukichou (2022–present)
 Johndre Jefferson (2021)
 Parfait Bitee (2011–2012)
 Wayne Arnold (2017–2020)
 Terrell Stoglin (2021; 2022–present)
 Abdoulaye Harouna (2021–present)
 Radhouane Slimane (2018–2020)

Head coaches
 Željko Zečević (2019)
 Said El Bouzidi (2020–2022)
 Liz Mills (2022)
 Said El Bouzidi (2022–present)

References

External links
Official website
FIBA Profile 
Afrobasket.com Profile

Basketball teams established in 1928
Salé
Sport in Salé
Basketball Africa League teams